Alicia González Blanco (born 27 May 1995) is a Spanish professional racing cyclist, who currently rides for UCI Women's WorldTeam .

Major results

2012
 10th Road race, UEC European Junior Road Championships
2013
 National Road Championships
1st  Road race
1st  Time trial
2015
 3rd Road race, National Road Championships
 6th Overall Vuelta a Burgos Feminas
2017
 5th Overall Vuelta a Burgos Feminas
 7th Road race, UEC European Under-23 Road Championships
2018
 3rd Time trial, National Road Championships
 3rd Overall Setmana Ciclista Valenciana
 3rd La Classique Morbihan
 5th Road race, Mediterranean Games
2019
 7th Clasica Femenina Navarra
 10th Durango-Durango Emakumeen Saria
2020
 9th GP de Plouay
2021
 10th ReVolta

See also
 List of 2015 UCI Women's Teams and riders

References

External links
 

1995 births
Living people
Spanish female cyclists
Competitors at the 2018 Mediterranean Games
People from Siero
Mediterranean Games competitors for Spain
Cyclists from Asturias
21st-century Spanish women